Ivan "Van" Smith is an American politician serving as a member of the Alabama House of Representatives from the 42nd district. He assumed office on November 6, 2019.

Early life and education 
Smith was born in Chilton County, Alabama. He earned a Bachelor of Science degree in agriscience from Auburn University, a Master of Science in agriscience from Alabama A&M University, and a teaching certificate in administrative education from the University of Montevallo.

Career 
Prior to entering politics, Smith worked as an educator for 30 years, including 13 as principal of Billingsley High School. Since 2013, he has worked as a cattle farmer. In November 2019, he was elected to the Alabama House of Representatives in a special election, succeeding Jimmy Martin.

References 

Living people
Educators from Alabama
Republican Party members of the Alabama House of Representatives
People from Chilton County, Alabama
Auburn University alumni
Alabama A&M University alumni
University of Montevallo alumni
Year of birth missing (living people)